Sheila MacLeod (born 23 March 1939) is a Scottish author and feminist.

Biography
Sheila MacLeod was born on 23 March 1939 in the Isle of Lewis, Outer Hebrides, Scotland. MacLeod attended the Wycombe Abbey School in Buckinghamshire, England before completing her degrees in English in Somerville College, Oxford. She got her bachelors in 1961 and her masters in 1993. MacLeod later completed a bachelor's in French from Birkbeck College, University of London in 1996.

MacLeod wrote for a number of publications including The Times Literary Supplement, Vogue, The Observer, and the Evening Standard. She also worked for Clarendon Press. Her novels ranged from science fiction to the non fantastic. MacLeod wrote a BBC television play in 1965 and another play in 1985.

MacLeod experienced anorexia during her teens and later wrote a book about her experiences based on diaries she kept at the time. It is considered a key feminist text on anorexia nervosa. She married Manfred Mann singer Paul Jones in 1963, but they later divorced. She moved to London with her sons, Matthew and Jacob.

Bibliography

Novels
The Moving Accident (1968)
The Snow-White Soliloquies (1970)
Letters From the Portuguese (1971)
Xanthe and the Robots (1976)
Circuit-Breaker (1977) 
Axioms (1984)

Teleplays
They Put You Where You Are (with Paul Jones, 1965)
God Speed Co-operation (1985)

Non-fiction
 D.H. Lawrence's Men and Women (1985)
The Art of Starvation: An Adolescence Observed (1981)

Sources

1939 births
Living people
Scottish writers
Alumni of Somerville College, Oxford
Alumni of Birkbeck, University of London